Dalton Township is one of fifteen townships in Wayne County, Indiana, United States. As of the 2010 census, its population was 566 and it contained 239 housing units.

History
Dalton Township was organized in 1847.

Geography
The streams of Corey Run, Flight Run, Franklin Run, Little Creek, Little Four Mile Creek, Mono Run, Propeller Run, Show Run, Single Run, West River and Wing Branch run through this township.

Unincorporated towns
 Dalton at 
 Franklin at 
(This list is based on USGS data and may include former settlements.)

Adjacent townships
 Union Township, Randolph County (northeast)
 Perry Township (east)
 Jefferson Township (south)
 Liberty Township, Henry County (southwest)
 Blue River Township, Henry County (west)

Major highways
 U.S. Route 35
 Indiana State Road 1

References
 
 United States Census Bureau cartographic boundary files

External links
 Indiana Township Association
 United Township Association of Indiana

Townships in Wayne County, Indiana
Townships in Indiana